Damerow is a village and a former municipality in the Vorpommern-Greifswald district, in Mecklenburg-Vorpommern, Germany. Since 1 January 2012, it is part of the municipality Rollwitz.

References

Villages in Mecklenburg-Western Pomerania